The Epson Grand Prix of Europe was a European Tour golf tournament which was held annually from 1986 to 1991 at St. Pierre Golf & Country Club in Chepstow, South Wales. It was a match play event for the first four years before switching to stroke play for the final two years. Four of the six champions were major championship winners. In 1991 the prize fund was £450,000, which was on the high side of middling for a European Tour event at that time.

Winners

External links
Coverage on the European Tour's official site

Former European Tour events
Golf tournaments in Wales
Defunct sports competitions in Wales